Fabienne Logtenberg (born 27 December 1991) is a former Dutch team handball player. She used to play for the club SV Dalfsen, and on the Dutch national team. She represented the Netherlands at the 2013 World Women's Handball Championship in Serbia.

References

External links 
 

1991 births
Living people
Dutch female handball players
Sportspeople from Deventer
21st-century Dutch women